Roxanne L. Johnson is an American chemist specialized in developing and applying quantitative methods to determine nutrients, organic and inorganic carbon and total suspended solids in estuarine seawater systems. She works for the United States Environmental Protection Agency.

Education 
Johnson completed a B.A. in chemical science at Connecticut College in 1965. In 1997, she earned a M.S. in statistics at the University of Rhode Island (URI).

Career and research 
From 1978 to 1982, Johnson was a research assistant in the URI biochemistry department. She was a marine research specialist at URI working for the United States Environmental Protection Agency (EPA) from 1982 to 1988. She worked as an associate chemist for the Science Applications International Corporation on contract with the EPA from 1988 to 1995. In 1995, Johnson joined the Atlantic Ecology Division of the EPA's National Health and Environmental Effects Research Laboratory.

Johnson develops and applies quantitative methods to determine nutrients, organic and inorganic carbon and total suspended solids in estuarine seawater systems. She has developed and applied experimental designs and statistical analyses, using Primer and SAS, to the study of benthic communities as indicators of estuarine health in several New England estuarine systems.

References

External links
 

Living people
Year of birth missing (living people)
Place of birth missing (living people)
Connecticut College alumni
University of Rhode Island alumni
University of Rhode Island faculty
People of the United States Environmental Protection Agency
American women chemists
20th-century American women scientists
21st-century American women scientists
20th-century American chemists
21st-century American chemists
American women academics